Provo Municipal Airport  is a public-use airport  west of Provo, in Utah County, Utah. It is a small regional airport with domestic flights mainly to  destinations in the western United States.

Overview

In June 2011, Frontier Airlines began daily flights to Denver. (SkyWest Airlines flew to Provo in 1974–1975.)

Frontier's flights to Denver ended in January 2013.  Allegiant Air began flights to Phoenix/Mesa in February 2013; in March 2013, the airline announced twice-weekly flights to Oakland International Airport beginning June 7.  On July 4, 2013, it was announced that Allegiant Air would begin flying to Los Angeles International Airport beginning September 26, 2013.  In June 2016, Allegiant Air announced it would begin flying to San Diego International Airport beginning September 28, 2016. Service to Oakland and San Diego was suspended in 2018. Service to Tucson International Airport began on Nov 16, 2018. In August 2020, Allegiant Air announced it would begin flying to Denver International Airport beginning November 19, 2020. Later that year, it announced flights from Provo to Orange County, California, would begin in February 2021. In May 2021, Allegiant Air announced that it would add service to St. Pete-Clearwater International Airport in Florida and Phoenix Sky Harbor International Airport as additional destinations from Provo, with flights beginning in October 2021.

Utah based Breeze Airways added 5 routes from Provo in 2022 to San Francisco International Airport, Las Vegas Airport, Los Angeles International Airport, San Bernardino International Airport, and New York Westchester Airport.

History
The airport's Air Traffic Control Tower opened in 2005; previously, the airport was uncontrolled. When the control tower opened, the nearby airspace became Class D airspace over a radius of  around the airport and up to  MSL (2500 feet AGL), with a circular cutout in the southern portion surrounding nearby Spanish Fork-Springville Airport, which is not Class D.

In anticipation of airline service, a new terminal area was built in early 2011 to house Transportation Security Administration equipment for passenger screening. As of August 2012, a millimeter-wave full-body scanner is in use. In November 2019, the airport broke ground on a new $40 million terminal. The new terminal would have four gates initially, with future expansion to ten gates in total. The terminal was completed in May 2022, with a full shift to the new terminal and gates planned for a later date.

In 2022, the Allegiant Travel Company announced plans to invest $95 million to expand their presence in Provo and establish a four-aircraft base at the Provo Airport. 
 Additionally, Utah based Breeze Airways announced they would create the airline's Utah operating base at the airport with 4 airplanes, and 5 new routes.

In 2020 Duncan Aviation, the US largest general aviation maintenance MRO finished a 328,000 sq/ft maintenance facility on the north end of the field.

Facilities

 13/31:  asphalt
 18/36:  asphalt

Airlines and destinations

General Aviation
General aviation (GA) also contributes to the overall operations of the Provo airport. There are two Fixed Base Operators (FBO), Duncan Aviation, and Signature Flight Support on the field.  Utah Valley University operates a flight school, as well as its Fire and Rescue program, and there are also numerous privately owned aircraft and hangars based on the Provo airport property.

Statistics

Annual traffic

Accidents and incidents
There have been a total of 22 accidents and incidents in and around the Provo Airport since 1984.

On November 21, 1995, a Cessna 152 impacted terrain east of Provo five minutes after departing the Provo Municipal Airport. The sole pilot on board was fatally injured. Witnesses reported that the aircraft did not make any sudden movements to avoid the terrain or make any unusual engine noises. It was later found the pilot was terrified of serving jail time after being convicted in a pyramid scheme court case and that he was building a new identity after becoming estranged from his father. The NTSB ruled the probable cause of the accident was pilot suicide.
On July 16, 2001, a Diamond DA-20 collided with terrain following a loss of control during an aborted landing at Provo Municipal Airport. The sole student pilot on board was not injured. The probable cause was found to be an inadvertent stall induced by the pilot during the go-around attempt.
On April 17, 2003, a Cessna 310 crashed while inbound to Provo. The three people on board were declared dead at the scene. Wreckage signified the aircraft nosedived into the ground instead of skidding first.
On October 21, 2009, a Utah Valley University student was killed when the engine on his single-engine aircraft failed. The student was returning from Spanish Fork-Springville Airport when the accident occurred. The aircraft came to rest 500 feet short of the runway.
On March 28, 2013, a Diamond DA-20 crashed after its wing impacted the ground on a hard landing attempt. The student pilot on board escaped uninjured.
On August 16, 2019, a light sport aircraft's front nose gear collapsed on landing at Provo. Nobody on board was injured, and no runway damage was reported.
On January 31, 2022, a Piper PA-44 Seminole operated by the Utah Valley University School of Aviation Sciences suffered a landing gear collapse while performing a touch-and-go. The plane reportedly touched down safely, but the gear collapsed before the aircraft was able to lift off again. Neither person on board was injured.
On January 2, 2023, an Embraer Phenom 300 crashed shortly after takeoff.  As of January 3, 2023, the cause of the accident is under investigation. The pilot was fatally injured, and one passenger was critically injured.  The other 2 passengers received minor injuries.  The airport was closed until January 4 due to the investigation.

See also

 List of airports in Utah

References

External links

 Provo Municipal Airport, official website
 
 

Airports in Utah
Buildings and structures in Provo, Utah
Transportation in Utah County, Utah